Kings Family Restaurants is a chain of family restaurants based in North Versailles, Pennsylvania. It has 4 locations in Pennsylvania.

Kings logo has scarlet colored lettering, with a saffron outline.

History
Kings began in North Versailles, Pennsylvania in 1967 as Kings Country Shoppes.  This name was later changed to Kings Family Restaurants to indicate the establishment was a restaurant rather than a store.  By 1980 the number of restaurants had grown to 7, and 24 by 1990. As of 2006, there were 34 locations throughout Pennsylvania and one in Wintersville, Ohio.

Kings donates to many charity organizations, including the Veterans Leadership Program and the Make-A-Wish Foundation of Western Pennsylvania.

In July 2009, Kings Restaurants a new restaurant called Kings Hometown Grille.  It features a different design and layout, as well as a different menu from most King's locations.  Unlike any other locations in the chain, Kings Hometown Grille also offers alcoholic beverages, including beer, wine and cocktails. 

In 2015, Kelly Capital purchased the Kings Family Restaurants.  On March 26, 2017, it was announced that five of its earliest stores: Wexford, Bridgeville, Imperial, Harmarville, and Altoona restaurants would be shutting down at 7 p.m. that evening. Approximately 130 employees were given no notice, and were left jobless.

Fare 
Kings serves American cuisine, including sandwiches, salads, and burgers. The restaurant also serves ice cream and milkshakes. Kings is also famous for their Frownie Brownies, although the Frownie Brownie was discontinued with the chain's purchase by Kelly Capital

The Frownie has returned to the Menu as of March 2019.

Smoking 
Kings maintained smoking sections in most of its restaurants until a statewide smoking ban was enacted in Pennsylvania in September 2008.

References

External links
Official website

Companies based in Allegheny County, Pennsylvania
Restaurants established in 1967
Regional restaurant chains in the United States
1967 establishments in Pennsylvania
American companies established in 1967